Where the Hell's That Gold? (stylized as Where the Hell's That Gold?!!?) is a 1988 American Western television film written, directed and produced by Burt Kennedy and starring Willie Nelson, Jack Elam and Delta Burke. It was broadcast on the CBS Sunday Movie on November 13, 1988.

Premise
In 1895, outlaws Cross and Boone (Willie Nelson and Jack Elam) and Cross's moll Germany (Delta Burke) scrounge for a hidden fortune in stolen gold, fending off other outlaw gangs, Mexican revolutionaries, Indians and Wells Fargo Agents.

Cast
 Willie Nelson as Cross
 Delta Burke as Germany
 Jack Elam as Boone
 Alfonso Arau as Indio
 Gerald McRaney as Jones
 Annabelle Gurwitch as Jesse

Home video release
 The film was released on videocassette under the alternate title of Dynamite and Gold.
 On December 26, 2006, it was released on DVD and restored back to its original title.

External links
 
 
 

1988 television films
1988 Western (genre) films
1980s Western (genre) comedy films
American television films
Western (genre) television films
CBS network films
Films directed by Burt Kennedy
Films set in 1895
Films shot in New Mexico
1980s English-language films